Structure is a monthly peer-reviewed scientific journal established in September 1993 by Wayne Hendrickson, Carl-Ivar Brändén, and Alan R. Fersht. It focuses on structural biology, studies of macromolecular structure, and related issues. In early 1999, the journal merged with Folding & Design and the name changed to Structure with Folding & Design. In 2001, the journal reverted to Structure.

The journal is published by Cell Press and Christopher D. Lima and Andrej Sali served as editors-in-chief from 2003 to October 2021. The journal is now edited by an in-house team at Cell Press, with Karin Kühnel as editor-in-chhief.

External links

Biochemistry journals
Cell Press academic journals
Publications established in 1993
Monthly journals
English-language journals